Muzeum is a Prague Metro station providing the interchange between Lines A and C, and serving the National Museum. It is located at the top end of Wenceslas Square.

The Line C station was opened on 9 May 1974, with the first section of the Prague Metro, between Sokolovská and Kačerov. Two escalators and a staircase go to the vestibule.

The Line A station was opened on 12 August 1978 as part of the inaugural section of Line A, between Leninova and Náměstí Míru. It is a three-bore station with a shortened,  middle tunnel. The station at Line A was damaged during the 2002 floods and station at Line C was terminus.

Nearby Attractions
National Museum
Wenceslas Square

References

External links 

 Gallery and information 

Prague Metro stations
Railway stations opened in 1974
1974 establishments in Czechoslovakia
Railway stations in the Czech Republic opened in the 20th century